The Roman Father is a 1750 tragedy by the British writer William Whitehead. It is set during the reign of Tullus Hostilius, the legendary third King of Rome and his war with the neighbouring city of Alba Longa.

The original Drury Lane cast featured David Garrick as Horatius, Spranger Barry as Publius Horatius, John Sowdon as Tullius Hostilius, Thomas King as Valerius, Sarah Ward as Valeria and Hannah Pritchard as Horatia. Incidental music was composed by William Boyce. It was met with "extravagant applause" and ran for twelve performances that season. It was revived frequently at both Drury Lane and Covent Garden.

References

Bibliography
 Baines, Paul & Ferarro, Julian & Rogers, Pat. The Wiley-Blackwell Encyclopedia of Eighteenth-Century Writers and Writing, 1660-1789. Wiley-Blackwell, 2011.
 Bartlett, Ian & Bruce, Robert J. William Boyce: A Tercentenary Sourcebook and Compendium. Cambridge Scholars Publishing, 2011

1750 plays
Tragedy plays
West End plays
Plays by William Whitehead